Pol Calvet (born 19 April 1994) is a retired Spanish footballer who played as a central midfielder.

Club career
Born in Sant Cugat del Vallès, Barcelona, Catalonia, Calvet joined FC Barcelona's youth setup in 2008, aged 14. He made his Barça B debut on 23 March 2013, coming on as a late substitute for the reserves in a 0–1 home loss against SD Huesca for the Segunda División championship.

On 10 June 2013, Calvet was definitely promoted to the B-side. He was handed his first start on 31 August, in a 1–0 home win against Real Zaragoza.

On 7 January 2016, he joined Galician team Deportivo de La Coruña from Barcelona B, initially signing for the B–team until June 2016, but with an option to renew and be promoted to the first team at the end of the season. After leaving Deportivo, Calvet joined Llagostera and went on to make four appearances with the club.

In 2017 Calvet decided to play college soccer in the United States at the University of Pittsburgh. Following one year of college soccer, Calvet was selected by Los Angeles FC with the twenty fourth pick of the second round of the 2018 MLS SuperDraft but he was never offered a contract by the club.

On 11 November 2018, Calvert announced his retirement from football at the age of 24.

References

External links
 FC Barcelona official profile
 

1994 births
Living people
People from Sant Cugat del Vallès
Sportspeople from the Province of Barcelona
Spanish footballers
Footballers from Catalonia
Association football midfielders
Segunda División players
Segunda División B players
Tercera División players
FC Barcelona Atlètic players
Deportivo Fabril players
Pittsburgh Panthers men's soccer players
UE Costa Brava players
Spain youth international footballers
Los Angeles FC draft picks